Warczewiczella discolor is a species of orchid native to Colombia, Ecuador, Peru, Venezuela, Cuba, Costa Rica, Honduras, and Panama.

References

External links 
 
 

discolor
Epiphytic orchids
Orchids of Cuba
Orchids of South America
Orchids of Central America
Plants described in 1849